Alois-Konstantin, 9th Prince of Löwenstein-Wertheim-Rosenberg, full German name: Alois Konstantin Karl Eduard Joseph Johann Konrad Antonius Gerhard Georg Benediktus Pius Eusebius Maria, Fürst zu Löwenstein-Wertheim-Rosenberg (born 16 December 1941 in Würzburg, Bavaria) is a German businessman and, since 1990, the head of the mediatised House of Löwenstein-Wertheim-Rosenberg, the Catholic cadet line of the Princes of Löwenstein-Wertheim, itself the patrilineally senior but morganatic branch of the royal house of Wittelsbach, which ruled the Kingdom of Bavaria until 1918.

Early life
Alois was born in Würzburg, the fifth child and only son of Karl, Prince of Löwenstein-Wertheim-Rosenberg and his wife, Carolina dei Conti Rignon. He had four older sisters, Maria (wife of Joseph Archduke of Austria), Josephine (wife of Alexander Prince of Liechtenstein), Monika (wife of Don Jaime Mendez de Vigo y del Arco) and Christiane (wife of Michael Archduke of Austria), and two younger sisters, Elisabeth-Alexandra (wife of José Maria Trénor y Suarez de Lezo) and Lioba (wife of Moritz Eugen Prince of Oettingen-Oettingen and Oettingen-Wallerstein). He and his sisters spent their childhood in Bronnbach, and Alois attended school in Miltenberg.

Career
Alois graduated with a degree in law from the University of Würzburg. After working for Gulf Oil in Pittsburgh, he was director of Merck Finck & Co and LGT Bank. He is a commander of the Order of the Holy Sepulchre, a knight of the Order of the Golden Fleece, and a board member of the Papal Foundation Centesimus Annus Pro Pontifice (CAPP). He also serves as the director of the Forum of German Catholics' Congress on Joy and Faith.

Marriage and family

Alois married Anastasia (b. 14 February 1944, Brieg), the elder daughter of Prince Hubertus of Prussia, in a civil ceremony in 1965 in Bronnbach, and in a religious ceremony a month later in Erbach. The couple lives at Kleinheubach castle. They had four children:
Carl Friedrich Hubertus Georg Eduardo Paolo Nicolo Franz Alois Ignatius Hieronymus Maria (1966–2010); married Stephanie von Brenken, had children
Hubertus Maximilian Gabriel Louis Franz Constantin Dominik Wunibald Maria (born 1968); married to Iris von Dornberg
Christina Maria Johanna Caroline Magdalene Osy Cecilie Hermine Isidora Victoria Anastasia (b. 4 April 1974, Frankfurt). She married Guido von Rohr (b. 27 September 1969, Hanover) on 5 October 2002 in Kleinheubach. They have four children:
Antonius von Rohr (b. 7 August 2003, London)
Konstantin von Rohr (b. 8 June 2007)
Cecilia von Rohr (b. 6 October 2008, London)
Maria von Rohr (b. 6 October 2008, London)
Dominik Wilhelm Christian Nikolaus Sturmius Antonius Charles Benedikt Felix Maria (born 1983); married to Olga zu Castell-Rüdenhausen

His heir apparent is his grandson, Nicodemus, born 2 August 2001.

References and notes

External links
 Homepage des Hauses Löwenstein
 

1941 births
House of Löwenstein-Wertheim-Rosenberg
Princes of Löwenstein-Wertheim-Rosenberg
People from Kleinheubach
Businesspeople from Würzburg
German Roman Catholics
Living people
University of Würzburg alumni
Jurists from Bavaria
Knights of the Golden Fleece of Austria
Officers Crosses of the Order of Merit of the Federal Republic of Germany
Knights of the Holy Sepulchre